McKinley Township is the name of some places in the U.S. state of Michigan:

 McKinley Township, Emmet County, Michigan
 McKinley Township, Huron County, Michigan

See also 
 McKinley, Oscoda County, Michigan, an unincorporated community in Mentor Township, Oscoda County
 McKinley Township (disambiguation)

Michigan township disambiguation pages